The diocese of Karonga (in Latin: Dioecesis Karongana) is a see of the Roman Catholic Church suffragan of the Roman Catholic Archdiocese of Lilongwe. In 2010, it counted 61,000 baptized people among a population of 400,000 inhabitants. Its current bishop is Martin Anwel Mtumbuka.

Website 
 www.karongadiocese.org

Territory 
The diocese corresponds to the Chitipa District and the Karonga District of the Northern Region of Malawi.

The see is located in the city of Karonga, where the cathedral of Saint Mary stands.

The territory is divided into 5 parishes.

History 
The diocese was created on July 21, 2010, with the Papal bull Quo in Malavio of Pope Benedict XVI, taking territories from the Roman Catholic Diocese of Mzuzu. It was originally suffragan of the Roman Catholic Archdiocese of Blantyre.

On February 9, 2011, it entered the Ecclesiastical province of the Roman Catholic Archdiocese of Lilongwe.

Chronology of the bishops 
 Martin Anwel Mtumbuka since July 21, 2010

Statistics 
When it was created, the diocese counted 400,000 inhabitants among whom 61,000 were baptized, which is 15.3%.

|-
| 2010 || 61.000 || 400.000 || 15,3 || 15 || 9 || 6 || 4.067 || || 5 || 40 || 5
|}

External links 
 The Karonga Diocese official website
 The diocese on Catholic-hierarchy
 Papal bull Quo in Malavio
  Creation of the diocese
 The diocese on Giga-catholic

Karonga
Roman Catholic Ecclesiastical Province of Lilongwe